

Belgium
Belgian Congo – Pierre Ryckmans, Governor-General of the Belgian Congo (1934–1946)

France
 French Somaliland – 
 Hubert Jules Deschamps, Governor of French Somaliland (1938–1940)
 Gaëtan Louis Elie Germain, Governor of French Somaliland (1940)
 Pierre Marie Elie Louis Nouailhetas, Governor of French Somaliland (1940–1942)
 Guinea – 
 Louis-Placide Blacher, Governor of Guinea (1939–1940)
 Antoine Félix Giacobbi, Governor of Guinea (1940–1942)

Japan
 Karafuto – 
Toshikazu Munei, Governor-General of Karafuto (7 May 1938 – 9 April 1940)
Masayoshi Ogawa, Governor-General of Karafuto (9 April 1940 – 1 July 1943)
 Korea – Jirō Minami, Governor-General of Korea (1936–1942)
 Taiwan – 
Seizō Kobayashi, Governor-General of Taiwan (June 1936 – November 1940)
Kiyoshi Hasegawa, Governor-General of Taiwan (16 December 1940 – December 1944)

Portugal
 Angola – Manoel da Cunha e Costa Marquês Mano, High Commissioner of Angola (1939–1941)

United Kingdom
 Aden
 Sir Bernard Rawdon Reilly, Governor of Aden (1937–1940)
 John Hathorn Hall, Governor of Aden (1940–1945)
 Malta Colony
Charles Bonham-Carter, Governor of Malta (1936–1940)
William Dobbie, Governor of Malta (1940–1942)
 Northern Rhodesia – Sir John Alexander Maybin, Governor of Northern Rhodesia (1938–1941)

Colonial governors
Colonial governors
1940